Rhesus may refer to:

 Rhesus of Thrace, a king in Greek mythology
 In Greek mythology, a river-god, son of Oceanus and Tethys
 Rhesus (play), the Ancient Greek tragedy thought to have been written by Euripides
 Rhesus (river), a river of the Troad mentioned by Homer
 Rhesus macaque, also known as the rhesus monkey
 Rhesus factor, associated with a blood type, named after the monkey
 Rh disease, also known as rhesus disease
 9142 Rhesus, an asteroid
 Rhesus Glacier, Antarctica

See also

 
 
 Reeses
 Recess (disambiguation)